The  is in Shiga Prefecture, Japan. It was founded in 1996. The theme of the museum is "relationship between lakes and people" and introduces the nature and culture of Lake Biwa, the largest and oldest lake in Japan.

The Lake Biwa Museum's aquarium is one of the largest freshwater aquarium in Japan. The giant Lake Biwa catfish (Silurus biwaensis) is a popular symbol of the Lake Biwa Museum.

A full-scale replica of Maruko-bune, a traditional wooden sailing boat of the Lake Biwa, is on the exposition in the museum.

Exhibitions
 Gallery A: Geological history 
 Gallery B: Human history and folklore
 Gallery C: Environmental issues and ecology
 Discovery room for children
 Special exhibits
 Outdoor exhibits
 Aquarium

References

External links

  Lake Biwa Museum HP

Museums in Shiga Prefecture
Aquaria in Japan
Kusatsu, Shiga
Museums established in 1996
1996 establishments in Japan